Cameron Nordli-Kelemeti (born 20 September 1999) is a Fijian rugby union player for Newcastle Falcons in Premiership Rugby, the top division of English rugby union. His primary position is scrum half.

He has previously played for Jersey Reds in the RFU Championship on loan.

Career
Nordli-Kelemeti was born in Fiji, he was raised by his grandmother after his mother died when he was six years-old. Initially educated at LDS Primary school in Suva, at 11 he moved to Terrington Hall Prep School in North Yorkshire, England, on a scholarship.  He then attended Durham School and after playing for Newcastle Falcons' under 18s he signed a full time contract with Newcastle in February 2018.

In November 2018 he made his first team debut for Newcastle as a substitute in a Premiership Rugby Cup win away to Harlequins.  In February 2021, he joined Jersey Reds on loan in the RFU Championship, playing three times.  His league debut for Newcastle came in 2021, as a replacement again against Harlequins.

References

Fijian rugby union players
1999 births
Living people
Newcastle Falcons players
Jersey Reds players
Rugby union scrum-halves